Confuga is a genus of planthoppers in the family Cixiidae. Its only species is Confuga persephone, a troglobitic (cave-dwelling) planthopper that is endemic to New Zealand.  It is the only known species of cave-dwelling planthopper in New Zealand. 

The species was first described by Ronald Gordon Fennah in 1975, from specimens found in a cave east of Tākaka, in the South Island of New Zealand.

References

External links

 Confuga persephone discussed in RNZ Critter of the Week, 29 July 2022

Endemic fauna of New Zealand
Oecleini
Taxa described in 1975
Insects described in 1975